Rhizostoma pulmo, commonly known as the barrel jellyfish, the dustbin-lid jellyfish or the frilly-mouthed jellyfish, is a scyphomedusa in the family Rhizostomatidae. It is found in the northeast Atlantic, and in the Adriatic, Mediterranean Sea, Black Sea and Sea of Azov. It is also known from the southern Atlantic off the western South African coast and into False Bay.

It is common in the Irish Sea. On 13 July 2019, wildlife biologist Lizzie Daly dived off the coast of Cornwall in the United Kingdom, along with the underwater cinematographer Dan Abbott. The two divers shared their encounter with a human-sized barrel jellyfish, Rhizostoma pulmo. The species could typically grow up to one meter (3.2 feet) and weigh up to 25 kilograms (55 lbs). However, they are not larger than the lion's mane jellyfish.

Rhizostoma pulmo is moderately venomous but not as deadly as other species. Effects include a burning sensation on the skin, dermatitis, and ulcers which confirms it is toxic to humans. However, it does not pose a serious threat to humans.

It is a favourite food of the leatherback turtle.

In Asia, they are a source of bioactive compounds used in traditional food and medicine. One study indicates that washing in aqueous solutions and the separation of high molecular weight proteins from the extract, e.g., by membrane filtration, could be a way to remove possible toxic compounds from jellyfish extracts and to concentrate potentially bioactive soluble compounds. The potentially active soluble components may have uses as nutraceutical and cosmeceutical ingredients.

References

External links

 
Giant jellyfish the size of a human spotted by divers off English coast (video)
 Barrel Jellyfish,   article at Atlas Obscura, August 9, 2021

Rhizostomatidae
Animals described in 1778